The Farol da Ponta de São Jorge is an active lighthouse located on the north coast of the island of Madeira, Portugal. The lighthouse was built in 1959 on top of a cliff and has a focal height of 271 metres.

See also

 List of lighthouses in Portugal

References

Lighthouses completed in 1959
Lighthouses in Madeira